Lalit Dalmia (born 14 August 1979) is an Indian fashion designer from Delhi. He is known for his bridal and luxury wear.

Clients and projects 

Dalmia has dressed some of the leading Bollywood celebrities such as Esha Gupta, Gauahar Khan, Akshay Kumar, Isha Koppikar, Sunny Leone and Bollywood Film producer Aly Morani among several others. He has also dressed India's multiple Grand Slam champion Leander Paes, Tennis sensation Damir Džumhur, Russia's upcoming star Daniil Medvedev, US's Nicholas Monroe and Indian rookie Jeevan Nedunchezhiyan in Aircel Chennai Open fashion show. Apart from this, Dalmia has led many fashion shows as a leading designer and received an immense response for his innovative launch activities and collections

Fashion Shows 
Lakme Fashion Week 2016

Store Locations 
The brand has flagship stores in Pitam Pura and Chandni Chowk in New Delhi.

References

External links
 

Indian costume designers
Punjabi people
Living people
Indian male fashion designers
1979 births
20th-century Indian designers
21st-century Indian designers
Artists from Delhi